Pawelekville is an unincorporated community in Karnes County, Texas, United States. In 2014 it was inhabited by 110 people.

History 
The settlement had been established by the Silesian immigrants. Prior to 1947, it was called Carvajal Crossing, after the nearby ford with that name, located on the Cibolo Creek. It was later renamed to Pawelekville, after the Pawelek family.

In 1990 the community included a small number of houses, around the several businesses to serve the local agricultural community. Between 1964 and 1965, Pawelekville had 65 inhabitants. From 1970 to 2000 the population was estimated to be 105. In 2014 it had the population of 110.

References 

Unincorporated communities in Texas
Polish-American culture in Texas
Silesian-American culture in Texas
Silesian-American history
Silesian emigrants to the United States
Unincorporated communities in Karnes County, Texas
Polish communities in the United States